Nong Hin is a district (amphoe) of Loei province, northeastern Thailand.

Geography
Neighboring districts are (from the north clockwise) Wang Saphung, Pha Khao, Phu Kradueng, and Phu Luang.

History
The minor district (king amphoe) was established on 1 July 1997 with territory split off from Phu Kradueng district.

On 15 May 2007, all 81 minor districts in Thailand were upgraded to full districts. On 24 August, the upgrade became official.

Administration
The district is divided into three sub-districts (tambons), which are further subdivided into 34 villages (mubans). Nong Hin is a township (thesaban tambon) which covers parts of tambon Nong Hin. There are a further three tambon administrative organizations (TAO).

References

External links
amphoe.com

Nong Hin